The Des Moines Independent Community School District (The Des Moines Public Schools, or DMPS) is the largest public school district in Iowa. It is accredited by the North Central Association of Secondary Schools and Colleges and the Iowa Department of Education.

Area
The district currently serves most of the city of Des Moines as well as parts of suburban Pleasant Hill and Windsor Heights. The city is split into four different area districts. District one covers the west, two covers the north, three covers the east, and district four the south.

History
Advanced Placement Program and International Baccalaureate Programme

In 2008, Des Moines Public Schools became the first school district in Iowa to offer the International Baccalaureate (IB) Programme.

On January 9, 2023. Des Moines Public Schools was hit with a cybersecurity attack.

List of schools

High ("Secondary") schools
 East High School - Serving students located in the east segment.
 Hoover High School - Serving students located in the northwest segment.
 Lincoln High School - Serving students located in the south segment.
 North High School - Serving students located in the north segment.
 Roosevelt High School - Serving students located in the west segment.

Special schools & programs
 Scavo Campus — An alternative high school program serving 300 students, named after Vincent C. Scavo located at Central Campus downtown.
 Ruby Van Meter School - A special education school serving disabled students with high support needs.
 Central Academy (Est. 1985) - A magnet school located in downtown Des Moines nationally recognized for its academic achievements.
 Central Campus - A magnet program serving high school students throughout Iowa with 9 career academies. (Business Academy, Information Technology & Arts Academy, Engineering Academy, Human Service Academy, Health Sciences Academy, Skill Trades Academy, Technology & Systems Integration Academy, Transportation Academy)
 Academic Pathways - A set of three programs designed for both adults and current high schoolers who need a new path to earning a highschool diploma
 Orchard Place School - A Psychiatric Medical Institute for Children ages 10–18. The largest PMIC in Iowa
 The Des Moines Public Schools Virtual Campus is an online middle school and high school (6-12) serving students through all of Iowa.

Middle ("Intermediate") schools
 Brody Middle School
 Callanan Middle School
 Cowles Montessori School 
 Gateway Secondary School 
 Goodrell Middle School
 Harding Middle School
 Hiatt Middle School
 Hoyt Middle School
 McCombs Middle School
 Meredith Middle School
 Merrill Middle School
 Moulton Extended Learning Center 
 Weeks Middle School

Elementary ("Primary") schools
 Brubaker Elementary School
 Capitol View Elementary School
 Carver Community School (est. 2007)
 Cattell Elementary School
 Cowles Montessori Elementary School
 Downtown School
 Edmunds Elementary School
 Findley Elementary school
 Garton Elementary School
 Greenwood Elementary School
 Hanawalt Elementary School
 Hillis Elementary School
 Howe Elementary School
 Hubbell Elementary School
 Jackson Elementary School
 Jefferson Elementary Traditional School
 King Elementary School
 Lovejoy Elementary School
 Madison Elementary School
 McKinley Elementary School
 Monroe Elementary School
 Moore Elementary School
 Morris Elementary School
 Moulton Extended Learning Center 
 Oak Park Elementary School
 Park Avenue Elementary School
 Perkins Elementary School
 Phillips Elementary School
 Pleasant Hill Elementary School
 River Woods Elementary School
 Samuelson Elementary School 
 Smouse Elementary School
 South Union Elementary School
 Stowe Elementary School
 Studebaker Elementary School
 Walnut Street School
 Willard Elementary School
 Windsor Elementary School
 Wright Elementary School

Media
 Channel 12 is the school district's Educational-access television cable TV channel, which is provided through Mediacom Cable Television as part of a franchise agreement with the City of Des Moines. The district televises their school board meetings through this network. Additionally, the school district operates its own social media outlets.

Facts and Figures

Enrollment

 Note: The table rows shown in red represents data that was cited directly from the Des Moines Public Schools enrollment reports. Some of this data conflicts with data from the Iowa Department of Education annual reports. This is because the underlying data is complex, and the table above is a summary of the data collected from the two sources.

See also

 Lists of school districts in the United States
 List of school districts in Iowa
 Tinker v. Des Moines

References

External links
 Des Moines Public Schools Website

School districts in Iowa
Education in Des Moines, Iowa
School districts established in 1907
1907 establishments in Iowa